Anthony Ford  (born 14 May 1959) is an English former footballer. Through most of his career, Ford was a right-sided midfielder, but in later years, he was converted to right-back. In a career that spanned 27 years, across four decades, Ford played 931 league matches, which is the all-time record for matches played in the English league by an outfield player. He is one of three outfield players in English football to have ever passed 1,000 games in competitive matches (including league, cup and for Graham Alexander also national team games), the others being Scott McGleish and Graham Alexander.

Career

Playing career 
Ford began his career at his hometown club Grimsby Town, where he made his first-team debut as a 16-year-old in October 1975. He spent 11 years at Blundell Park, where he made his name as one of the most talented players outside the top division. In 1986, he left Grimsby. He first had a short loan spell at Sunderland, and later joined Stoke in a permanent deal.

Ford spent two and a half years at Stoke, before being transferred to West Bromwich Albion midway through the 1988–89 season. After three years at The Hawthorns, he rejoined Grimsby in late 1991. His second spell at Blundell Park lasted three seasons, and he left the club at the end of the 1993–94 season, having played 423 league games for the club, which at the time placed him second on the club's career appearance list behind Keith Jobling.

In 1994, Ford joined Grimsby's arch-rivals Scunthorpe, where he played two seasons. After a short spell at non-league side Barrow, he was asked by Steve Parkin, a former teammate at Stoke and West Bromwich Albion, who had recently been appointed manager at Mansfield, to become his assistant. This allowed Ford to continue his playing career, and in early 1999, he played his 825th career league game, breaking Terry Paine's record for career appearances by an outfield player.

Coaching career 
In the summer of 1999, Parkin resigned as Mansfield manager to take a similar job at Rochdale. He again appointed Ford as his assistant, and, aged 40, Ford continued to play regularly. The final goal of his career was the winner in a 1–0 win at Swansea City on 9 October 2001, and his final professional appearance came the following month against Torquay United. 

He retired from playing in November 2001 when he and Parkin took up the same positions at Barnsley. Both were sacked by the club eleven months later, but in August 2003 he returned to his former role at Rochdale under new manager Alan Buckley. He kept his job when Buckley made way for Parkin on 31 December 2003, but was sacked along with the latter three years later.

He went on to work for his former club Grimsby Town as a scout, but was relieved of his duties in May 2011.

Career statistics 
Source:

A.  The "Other" column constitutes appearances and goals in the Anglo-Scottish Cup, Football League Group Cup, Football League Trophy and Full Members Cup.

Honours 
 Grimsby Town
Football League Group Cup: 1982
Supporters Player of the Year: 1984, 1985
Supporters Young Player of the Year: 1976

See also 
 List of men's footballers with the most official appearances

References

External links 
 

1959 births
Living people
Footballers from Grimsby
English footballers
England B international footballers
English Football League players
Grimsby Town F.C. players
Sunderland A.F.C. players
Stoke City F.C. players
West Bromwich Albion F.C. players
Bradford City A.F.C. players
Scunthorpe United F.C. players
Mansfield Town F.C. players
Rochdale A.F.C. players
Rochdale A.F.C. non-playing staff
Grimsby Town F.C. non-playing staff
Members of the Order of the British Empire
Association football midfielders